Language and mythology may refer to:
Mythical origins of language
Divine language
Language of the birds
True name